Xavier O'Callaghan Ferrer (born March 2, 1972) is a Spanish handball player who competed in the 2000 Summer Olympics and in the 2004 Summer Olympics.

He was born in Barcelona.

In 2000 he won the bronze medal with the Spanish team. He played three matches and scored five goals.

Four years later he  finished seventh with the Spanish handball team in the 2004 Olympic tournament. He played six matches and scored eight goals.

External links
profile

1972 births
Living people
Spanish male handball players
Olympic handball players of Spain
Handball players at the 2000 Summer Olympics
Handball players at the 2004 Summer Olympics
Olympic bronze medalists for Spain
Spanish people of Irish descent
Olympic medalists in handball
Medalists at the 2000 Summer Olympics
Handball players from Catalonia
21st-century Spanish people